Drechslera gigantea is a plant pathogen that causes eyespot disease on many host plants. There are Poa pratensis turfgrass cultivars that are resistant to D. gigantea, although that resistance is not as effective when stressed.

References

External links
 USDA ARS Fungal Database

Fungal plant pathogens and diseases
Pleosporaceae